Umberto Lenzi (6 August 1931 – 19 October 2017) was an Italian film director, screenwriter, and novelist.

A fan of film since young age, Lenzi studied at the Centro Sperimentale di Cinematografia and made his first film in 1958 which went unreleased, while his official debut happened in 1961 with Queen of the Seas. Lenzi's films of the 1960s followed popular trends of the era, which led to him directing several spy and erotic thriller films. He followed in suit in the 1970s making giallo films, crime films and making the first Italian cannibal film with Man from the Deep River. He continued making films up until the 1990s and later worked as a novelist writing a series of murder mysteries.

Biography

Early life
Umberto Lenzi was born on 6 August 1931 in the Massa Marittima province of Italy. Lenzi was a film enthusiast as early as grade school. While studying law, Lenzi also created film fan clubs. Lenzi eventually put off studying law and began pursuing the technical arts of filmmaking.

He graduated from Rome's Centro Sperimentale di Cinematografia in 1956 and made I ragazzi di Trastevere as his final exam, a short film influenced by the writings of Pier Paolo Pasolini. Lenzi also worked as a journalist for various newspapers and magazines, including Bianco e Nero and, between 1957 and 1960, penned a number of detective novels and adventure stories using a pseudonym.

1960s
Prior to his officially first credited film as a director, Queen of the Seas, Lenzi directed a film in Greece in 1958 titled Mia Italida stin Ellada, or Vacanze ad Atene, which was never released.

Lenzi's films of the 1960s revolved around popular genres of their respective time periods. In the early 1960s, Lenzi directed many adventure films including two features about Robin Hood (The Triumph of Robin Hood and The Invincible Masked Rider) and two films about Sandokan (Sandokan the Great (1963) and Pirates of Malaysia (1964)).

By 1965, Lenzi began directing European spy films, such as 008: Operation Exterminate, followed by Super Seven Calling Cairo and The Spy Who Loved Flowers, and even adapted the fumetti neri comic character Kriminal to the screen. Lenzi then turned to making war films such as Desert Commandos and Legion of the Damned and westerns such as Pistol for a Hundred Coffins and All Out (1968).

Lenzi had box office success in Italy with his erotic thrillers starring Carroll Baker such as Orgasmo, So Sweet... So Perverse and A Quiet Place to Kill which were influenced by French "film noir" movies drawing from the works of Jacques Deray and René Clément.

1970s
After the commercial success of giallo films by Dario Argento, Lenzi followed the new trend with Seven Bloodstained Orchids, which referenced both Cornell Woolrich and Edgar Wallace novels, while another giallo Knife of Ice was a variation of Robert Siodmak's The Spiral Staircase. Other gialli created by Lenzi in the early 1970s included Spasmo and Eyeball.

During the early 1970s, Lenzi also directed the first of the Italian cannibal films, with Man from the Deep River, a genre that he would explore again in the 1980s with Eaten Alive! and Cannibal Ferox. During the late 1970s, Lenzi devoted himself almost exclusively to crime dramas, with the exception of two war films: The Greatest Battle and From Hell to Victory (1979).

1980s
The 1980s marked the release of films that Roberto Curti described as some of Lenzi's "most notorious". These included Nightmare City and the previously mentioned Cannibal Ferox.

Lenzi also worked on horror films towards the late 1980s, such as Ghosthouse (1988) under the name Humphrey Humbert and the slasher film Nightmare Beach which was credited to Harry Kirkpatrick as Lenzi refused to sign his name to the film. Other later 1980s work included horror films made for television, such as The House of Witchraft and The House of Lost Souls. Both films were part of a series titled Le case maldette which were set up by Luciano Martino and were related by the theme of haunted houses. The films were shot but the series was not broadcast immediately. Lenzi reflected on these films saying he made them as if they were designed for theatrical release and that  the producers, his colleagues and himself did not consider that television sponsors would not accept horror films. The two television series were eventually released on VHS in 2000 in Italy and later broadcast on Italian satellite TV in 2006. In 1989, Lenzi directed the police action film Cop Target in Miami and Santo Domingo, starring Robert Ginty and Charles Napier.

Post-1980s
In 1990, using his own company and a low amount of funds, Lenzi also shot two films in Brazil in a period of three months: the horror film Black Demons, which in 1996 he considered to be his masterpiece, and the adventure film Hunt for the Golden Scorpion.

In 1992, he shot the adventure film Mean Tricks (also known as Hornsby and Rodriguez) starring Charles Napier, David Warbeck and David Brandon. Variety reported in 2006 that Lenzi was shooting a slasher film in Italy titled Horror Baby. The film's story was about a 15-year-old paraplegic girl who becomes a serial killer after viewing a neighbor having sex from her window.

Lenzi later embarked on a career as a novelist, writing a series of murder mysteries set in the 1930s and '40s Cinecittà, involving real-life characters of the Italian film industry.

Death
Lenzi died on 19 October 2017. The director was hospitalized in the Ostia district of Rome. The cause of death is unknown.

Personal life
Umberto Lenzi was married to Olga Pehar, who co-wrote some of his films.

Lenzi was an anarchist.

Legacy
Roberto Curti referred to Lenzi as "one of the undisputed leading figures in Italian genre cinema" and that he was "a sort of institution in Italian genre cinema." Louis Paul suggested that Lenzi released some "quite enjoyable action films in the 1960s and some good thrillers in the '70s, he never consistently excelled at any one genre" and that Lenzi would "probably be remembered most for his cannibal-themed horror films." Kim Newman discussed Lenzi in 2021, stating that the director "has been rated towards the bottom of the ranks of Italian genre craftsmen by many - me included - because of the greater availability of his pulpier, more gruesome 1980s work" noting Cannibal Ferox and Nightmare City and stated that "though a trailblazer for the little-loved jungle cannibal cycle, contributing its earliest and most gruesome entries, in general Lenzi seemed one of the coat-tail riders, turning to whatever subgenre of exploitation was selling that year...and even in that class, he's less consistently interesting and exciting than Sergio Martino." Newman did note the film Lenzi made with Carroll Baker in the late 1960s, which Newman stated "force a reassessment" on Lenzi's work.

Select filmography

See also 
 Cannibal boom
 Centro Sperimentale di Cinematografia
 Poliziotteschi
 Spaghetti Nightmares

References

Bibliography

External links 
 

1931 births
2017 deaths
People from Massa Marittima
Italian film directors
Horror film directors
Giallo film directors
Spaghetti Western directors
Centro Sperimentale di Cinematografia alumni
Poliziotteschi directors
Italian anarchists